King's Gold is a novel by South African author Glenn Macaskill, published in 2003 by Crest Publishing. It contains graphic (though fictional) references to the Gukurahundi, the occupation of Matabeleland by Zimbabwe's Fifth Brigade in the 1980s. The majority of the book is centred on two main plotlines: The political efforts of the Zimbabwe African People's Union, and the discovery and subsequent extraction of an ancient treasure, a solid gold bird statue created at the whim of King Mzilikazi some 180 years before.

2003 novels
21st-century South African novels
Novels set in Zimbabwe